Wild Target is a 1993 French comedy film directed by Pierre Salvadori. Its plot revolves around an aging hitman who falls for his much younger target and ends up protecting her. A remake directed by Jonathan Lynn was released in 2010.

Selected Cast
 Jean Rochefort - Victor Meynard
 Marie Trintignant - Renée Dandrieux
 Guillaume Depardieu - Antoine
 Serge Riaboukine - Manu
 Patachou - Madame Meynard

References

External links 

French black comedy films
1993 comedy films
1993 films
1990s French films